Gonocephalus beyschlagi, also known commonly as the Sumatra forest dragon, is a species of lizard in the family Agamidae. The species is native to northern Sumatra, Indonesia.

Etymology
The specific name, beyschlagi, is in honor of Fritz Beyschlag who collected the holotype.

Description

Reproduction
G. beyschlagi is oviparous.

References

Further reading
Boettger O (1892). "Listen von Kriechtieren und Lurchen aus dem tropischen Asien und aus Papuasien ". Bericht über die Thätigkeit des Offenbacher Vereins für Naturkunde 1892: 65–164. (Gonyocephalus beyschlagi, new species, p. 102). (in German).
Manthey U, Grossmann W (1997). Amphibien und Reptilien Südostasiens. Münster: Natur und Tier Verlag. 512 pp. . (Gonocephalus beyschlagi, p. 178). (in German).
de Rooij N (1915). The Reptiles of the Indo-Australian Archipelago. I. Lacertilia, Chelonia, Emydosauria. Leiden: E.J. Brill. xiv + 384 pp. (Gonyocephalus beyschlagi, p. 105).

Gonocephalus
Reptiles of Indonesia
Endemic fauna of Sumatra
Reptiles described in 1892
Taxa named by Oskar Boettger